The Utica Fire and City Hall in Utica, South Dakota was built around 1915.  It was listed on the National Register of Historic Places in 1980.

It is a two-story building with stamp metal facing upon a stone foundation, with a hipped roof.  It has two fire doors.  In 1980, the building still contained "four fire carts, with wooden wheels manufactured by the W.S. Knott Company of Minneapolis, Minnesota"; "these objects are more scarce than the building itself."

References

External links

City and town halls on the National Register of Historic Places
Fire stations on the National Register of Historic Places in South Dakota
National Register of Historic Places in Yankton County, South Dakota
Government buildings completed in 1915
Government buildings on the National Register of Historic Places in South Dakota
1915 establishments in South Dakota
Fire stations completed in 1915